"Touch Me (All Night Long)" is a 1984 song by American singer Fonda Rae and American band Wish. It was a minor hit for Rae and the band, and was featured in the 1985 slasher film A Nightmare on Elm Street 2: Freddy's Revenge. In the original, it is alternately spelled as "Tuch Me (All Night Long)" or simply just "Tuch Me".

Track listing and formats
 US 12-inch vinyl single
Tuch Me (All Night Long) – 9:32
Tuch Me (All Night Long) Radio Version – 3:34
Tuch Me (All Night Long) Dub Version – 7:25

 UK 12-inch vinyl single
Tuch Me (All Night Long) – 9:32
Tuch Me (All Night Long) Short Version – 4:34
Tuch Me (All Night Long) Special Mix For Break Dancing – 7:25

Charts

Cathy Dennis version

A cover on "Touch Me (All Night Long)" was released by British singer and songwriter Cathy Dennis on 14 January 1991 as the third single from her debut studio album, Move to This (1990), where it is listed as either "Touch Me (All Night Long)" or "All Night Long (Touch Me)". Her version contained some rewritten lyrics in the verses. It was a number-one hit on the US Billboard Dance Club Songs chart.

Dennis performed the song on the season three, episode of Beverly Hills, 90210, "A Night to Remember", in 1993.

Critical reception
Larry Flick from Billboard described the song as a "house-savvy rendition of the Fonda Rae disco nugget." He added that it is a "fine showcase for Dennis's bright and chirpy vocal style." Dave Sholin from the Gavin Report commented that "after hearing this track, there's every reason to believe she'll be travelling up the chart again." He also added that as co-writer and co-producer, "this exciting vocalist creates mature dance music that can entertain young and older audiences alike." James Hamilton from Music Week deemed it a "breezy Fonda Rae revival".

Chart performance
"Touch Me (All Night Long)" peaked at number one in Zimbabwe, number nine in Canada, number five in the United Kingdom and number three in Ireland. In the United States, "Touch Me" reached number two on the Billboard Hot 100 on the week of 18 May 1991. In addition, "Touch Me" spent one week at the top of the US Dance Club Songs chart in March 1991, becoming her biggest hit in the country.

Music video
The accompanying music video for “Touch Me (All Night Long)" was directed by Rocky Morton and Annabel Jankel. It was later published on YouTube in July 2018. By April 2022, the video had more than three million views.

Impact and legacy
BuzzFeed ranked Dennis' version of "Touch Me (All Night Long)" at number 19 in their list of "The 101 Greatest Dance Songs of the '90s" in 2017. 

In 2019, Billboard listed it at number 188 in their ranking of "Billboards Top Songs of the '90s".

In 2020, Slant Magazine placed the song at number 89 in their list of "The 100 Best Dance Songs of All Time". They added,

"...Cathy Dennis made Fonda Rae's disco trifle “Touch Me (All Night Long)” her own by completely rewriting the song’s throwaway verses, imbuing a fleeting physical connection with the weight of manifest destiny. DJ extraordinaire Shep Pettibone likewise put his signature on the track by amping up the melodic hook and distinctive Roland 909 house beats, propelling it into the stratosphere of early-'90s house-pop."

Track listing and formats
 US 7-inch vinyl and cassette single
Touch Me (All Night Long) 7" Mix – 3:28
Touch Me (All Night Long) Hot Mix – 4:01

 US 12-inch vinyl single
Touch Me (All Night Long) Club Mix – 7:17
Touch Me (All Night Long) All Night Long Mix – 6:46
Touch Me (All Night Long) 7" Mix – 3:28
Touch Me (All Night Long) Touch This – 7:47
Touch Me (All Night Long) Rhodesapella Mix – 4:06
Touch Me (All Night Long) Dub All Night Long – 5:21

 UK CD maxi-single
Touch Me (All Night Long) 7" Mix – 3:28
Touch Me (All Night Long) Club Mix – 7:17
Touch Me (All Night Long) All Night Long Mix – 6:46

Charts

Weekly charts

Year-end charts

Other versions
"Touch Me (All Night Long)" was released in 2004 by electronic dance group Angel City from their debut studio album, Love Me Right. The band was formed by Zentveld & Oomen. It was the follow-up to the group's 2003 single, "Love Me Right (Oh Sheila)". It reached number two on the UK dance charts and number 18 on the UK Singles Chart. It shares the chorus from Cathy Dennis's 1991 hit single "Touch Me (All Night Long)", but has different verses. "Touch Me (Radio Edit)" was released in 2015 by former singer-songwriter Lauren Ashleigh. It never entered any charts but was regularly played on BBC Essex and Kiss FM.

See also
List of number-one dance singles of 1991 (U.S.)

References

1984 singles
1984 songs
1991 singles
Cathy Dennis songs
Eurodance songs
House music songs
Music videos directed by Rocky Morton
Number-one singles in Zimbabwe
Polydor Records singles
Songs written by Cathy Dennis
Song recordings produced by Cathy Dennis
Songs written by Patrick Adams (musician)